RZA is the stage name of Robert Diggs (born 1969) an American musician and member of the Wu-Tang Clan.

Rza or RZA may also refer to:

People
Rasul Rza (1910–1981), Azerbaijani writer
Rza Tahmasib (1894–1980), Azerbaijani film director and actor
Rza Osmanov, Azerbaijani athlete; see Azerbaijan at the 2012 Summer Paralympics
Khalil Rza Uluturk (1932–1994), Azerbaijani poet
Bulbul (singer) (1897–1961), born Murtuza Rza oglu Mammadov, Azerbaijani opera singer

Other uses
Religious Zionists of America, official body for Modern Orthodox Jews who identify with Religious Zionism
Republic of South Africa, abbreviated RZA in Dutch

See also
Riza, a metal cover protecting a religious icon
Rize (disambiguation)